The handball women's tournament at the 2019 Pan American Games in Lima, Peru was held between 24 and 30 July 2019. Eight nations participated. Brazil won its sixth straight title, directly qualifying to the 2020 Summer Olympics.

Qualification 
A total eight women's teams qualified to compete at the games in each tournament. The host nation (Peru) qualified in each tournament, along with seven other teams in various qualifying tournaments.

Summary

 Chile (3rd placed finisher at the South American Games), Mexico and Guatemala (4th and 5th at the Central American and Caribbean Games) and Canada (loser of the North Zone Qualifying) competed in the Repechage tournament.

North Zone Qualifying

United States won 48–36 on aggregate.

Repechage qualification tournament

Results 
All times are in Peru Time (UTC−5).

Preliminary round

Group A

Group B

Classification round

5–8th place semifinals

Seventh place match

Fifth place match

Medal round

Semifinals

Bronze medal match

Gold medal match

Ranking and statistics

Top scorers

Source: Lima 2019

Top goalkeepers

Source: Lima 2019

References 

Women
Pan American Games